People's Embassies of Belarus is a project of Belarusian diaspora abroads that was created due to not recognizing the official results of the 2020 Belarusian presidential election.

History 
The decision to create the People's Embassies of Belarus was made by representatives of the Belarusian diaspora on the basis of the resolution of the World Congress of Belarusians. The Congress took place from 30 October to 1 November 2020. On 10 December the opening ceremony of People's Embassies was held online. The People's Embassies stated that their embassies were opened in Australia, Austria, Brazil, Canada, Estonia, France, Germany, Lithuania, Luxembourg, Montenegro, Netherlands, Poland, Portugal, Scotland, Slovenia, South Korea, Spain, Sweden, Ukraine and the UK.

Main functions 
The Belarusian diaspora named the main functions of People’s Embassies of Belarus. They are informing the public about the situation in Belarus; establishing and maintaining contacts with government bodies, public associations, trade unions, business, scientific and cultural circles abroad; protection of the rights and interests of Belarusians living abroad as well as the assistance to those forced to leave the country.

References

External links 

The opening ceremony on YouTube

Belarusian diaspora
Politics of Belarus